My Lady's Latchkey is a 1921 American mystery film directed by Edwin Carewe and written by Finis Fox. It is based on the 1920 novel The Second Latchkey by Charles Norris Williamson and Alice Muriel Williamson. The film stars Katherine MacDonald, Edmund Lowe, Claire Du Brey, Howard Gaye, Lenore Lynard and Thomas Jefferson. The film was released in January 1921, by Associated First National Pictures.

Cast       
Katherine MacDonald as Annesley Grayle
Edmund Lowe as Nelson Smith
Claire Du Brey as Countess Santiago
Howard Gaye as Lord Annesley-Seton
Lenore Lynard as Lady Annesley-Seton
Thomas Jefferson as Ruthven Smith
Helena Phillips Evans as Mrs. Ellsworth

References

External links
 

1921 films
American mystery films
1921 mystery films
First National Pictures films
Films directed by Edwin Carewe
American silent feature films
American black-and-white films
Films based on works by Alice Williamson
1920s English-language films
1920s American films
Silent mystery films